t Zand is a hamlet in the Dutch province of Gelderland. It is located in the municipality of Hattem, about 6 km west of the city of Zwolle.

't Zand is not a statistical entity, and the postal authorities have placed it under Hattem. It consists of about 15 houses.

References

Populated places in Gelderland
Hattem